Basu Paribaar (also spelt Basu Paribar) is a 2019 Bengali film directed by Suman Ghosh. Soumitra Chatterjee and Aparna Sen play the lead roles. It marks the reunification of the actors after 18 years. They last paired in Paromitar Ekdin (2000). The movie was released on April 5, 2019.

Plot
The plot is derived from James Joyce's short story "The Dead". This story revolves around the celebration of the 50th wedding anniversary of an old couple, Pranabendu and Manjari. In this occasion, they have invited all their relatives and friends to their ancient home, Komolini. While everyone is indulging themselves in merry making, Tublu prefers staying alone. He seems to be haunted by some previous memories which he has with this house. The celebration is short lived as hidden complexities start surfacing in the personal lives of the family members. While Pranab boasts of his royal blood and his hereditary aristocracy, he tries to avoid the presence of a crazy old man who lives alone in a dilapidated portion of the house. During dinner time, the same old man arrives at the dinner table. After seeing Pranab angrily scoffing at the poor man, Tublu loses his cool. He accuses Pranab that his vain illusions about aristocracy had been instrumental in the death of the old man's only son Sajal, with whom Tublu had a deep bond. During his youth, Pranab could not tolerate the growing friendship between Manjari and Sajal due to their difference in social status. He took her away to England and Sajal died in her absence. Manjari gets strongly reminded of Sajal's excellent singing skills after hearing a song from Tublu. When Pranab tries to comfort her saying that everything was alright between them in all these years, she coldly asks if at all everything was alright between them.

Cast 

 Soumitra Chatterjee as Pranabendu
 Aparna Sen as Manjari
 Rituparna Sengupta as Priya
 Saswata Chatterjee as Tublu
 Jisshu Sengupta as Pratim
 Koushik Sen as Tanmoy
 Paran Bandopadhyay as Porimal
 Lily Chakravarty as Jethima  
 Sreenanda Shankar as Roshni
 Sudipta Chakraborty as Pompi
 Subhashish Mukhopadhyay as Photik
 Arun Mukherjee as Prahlad
 Arun Guhathakurta as Golok
 Anindita Bose as young Manjari

Shooting
The film's shooting began in July 2017. It has been shot in various locations of West Bengal including Mahishadal Rajbari.

References

External links

2019 films
Indian drama films
Bengali-language Indian films
2010s Bengali-language films
Films scored by Bickram Ghosh
2019 drama films
Films directed by Suman Ghosh